Chowki No. 2 is a village in Rewari mandal of Jatusana block, in the Indian state of Haryana.

Demographics
As of 2011 India census, Chowki No. 2 had a population of 753 in 349 households. Males constituted 51.39% of the population and females 48.6%. The average literacy rate was 67.19%, less than the national average of 74%: male literacy was 60.47%, and female literacy was 39.52%. In Chowki No. 2, 15.8% of the population was under 6 years of age (119).

Adjacent villages
Motla Kala
Motla Khurd
Aulant
Berli Kalan
Haluhera
Berli Khurd

References

Villages in Rewari district